Jean-Pierre Corteggiani (1942 – 15 March 2022) was a French Egyptologist.

Career 
In 1993, a dyke was to be built on the alleged site of the Lighthouse of Alexandria. A rescue operation was entrusted to Jean-Yves Empereur and Jean-Pierre Corteggiani to undertake a search campaign. In 2001, he was awarded the Jean-Édouard Goby Prize from the Institut de France for his works on ancient Egypt.

He was director of IFAO’s scientific and technical relations until 2007.

He was the author of several books and articles, he highlights his work in the book , a collective work on Cairo published by Citadelles & Mazenod.

Selected publications 
 The Egypt of the Pharaohs at the Cairo Museum, Hachette, 1993
 Toutânkhamon : Le trésor, collection « Découvertes Gallimard Hors série ». Éditions Gallimard, 2000
 Les Grandes Pyramides : Chronique d’un mythe, collection « Découvertes Gallimard » (nº 501), série Archéologie. Éditions Gallimard, 2006
 US edition – The Great Pyramids, “Abrams Discoveries” series. Harry N. Abrams, 2007
 UK edition – The Pyramids of Giza: Facts, Legends and Mysteries, ‘New Horizons’ series. Thames & Hudson, 2007
 L’Égypte ancienne et ses dieux : Dictionnaire illustré, Fayard, 2007

References 

1942 births
2022 deaths
French Egyptologists
Members of the Institut Français d'Archéologie Orientale